Bullhead Lake may refer to:

Lakes 
In the United States:
 Bullhead Lake (Glacier County, Montana)
 Bullhead Lake in Chippewa River (Michigan)
 Bullhead Lake in Lake Eunice Township, Becker County, Minnesota
 Bullhead Lake in Kego Township, Cass County, Minnesota
 Bullhead Lake in Sugar Bush Township, Becker County, Minnesota
 Bullhead Lake in Kelliher Township, Beltrami County, Minnesota
 Bullhead Lake (Otter Tail County, Minnesota)
 Bullhead Lake (Watonwan County, Minnesota)
 Bullhead Lake (Roberts County, South Dakota)